"Back to Life (However Do You Want Me)" is a song by British R&B band Soul II Soul featuring the Reggae Philharmonic Orchestra. It appears on a secondary version of their debut album, Club Classics Vol. One (1989) (titled Keep On Movin in the United States), and was released as its second single on 29 May 1989. "Back to Life" is one of two songs on the album featuring British R&B singer Caron Wheeler and gained success in both North America and Europe, topping the charts in the Netherlands and the United Kingdom and peaking at number four in the United States. The group won their first Grammy Award for Best R&B Performance by a Duo or Group with Vocal with the song in 1990.

Production
The album version of the song was an a cappella which was remixed and re-recorded before being released as a single. Two new versions were produced — the first taking the original recording with instrumentation added, and the second was a re-working of the song with new lyrics and chorus (also adding "However Do You Want Me" to the title). It was the second version that became most popular. In a 2012 interview with British newspaper The Guardian on how "Back to Life" was made, producer Jazzie B said:

Everything about this single was magic. We weren't trying to follow any trend or fit into any category – we were just doing our own thing. ... Its shuffling beats were a cross between reggae and what was to become known as hip-hop: breakbeats and electronic sound. Caron Wheeler's vocal, coming over these very heavy bass beats, was the icing on the cake. ... We also had the Reggae Philharmonic Orchestra on the track, and the RPO became a key part of our sound. ... We often look to America for our influences, but this was a moment that put British music back on the map. It also came out at a special time in the industry's history – just before digital took over and everything seemed to fall apart.

For a time, the album was packaged together with a CD3 single including the new versions of the song.

Chart performance
"Back to Life (However Do You Want Me)" peaked at number-one on both the Billboard Hot Dance Club Play chart in the United States and the RPM Dance/Urban chart in Canada. It went to number four on the Billboard Hot 100, becoming one of Soul II Soul's most successful singles in the United States (and the only one to enter in the top 10). In the United Kingdom it performed even better, reaching number-one in the UK Singles Chart for four weeks in June and July 1989. In Europe, it peaked at number-one also in the Netherlands, as well as on the Eurochart Hot 100. The single entered the top 10 also in Belgium (4), West Germany (4), Greece (2), Ireland (6), Sweden (3) and Switzerland (2), and was a top 20 hit in both Austria (13) and Finland (14). In Oceania, it peaked at number four in New Zealand and number 45 in Australia. 

"Back to Life (However Do You Want Me)" earned a gold record in Canada and Sweden, a silver record in the UK, and a platinum record in the US. It went on to win the group their first Grammy Award for Best R&B Performance by a Duo or Group with Vocal in 1990.

Critical reception
Geir Rakvaag from Norwegian Arbeiderbladet complimented "Back to Life (However Do You Want Me)" as "delicate". Robert Hilburn from Los Angeles Times wrote, "Another classy and imaginative dance-floor soundscape from the London team that gave us "Keep On Movin'". The album version is mostly a cappella (and it's fine), but the 7-inch single is even more seductive." Another editor, Duff Marlowe, remarked that the "gorgeously arranged", a cappella "Back to Life", "shows that the sound-system concept not only works, but also may be an effective way of presenting a wide range of talent." Jerry Smith from Music Week praised it as another "totally mesmerising killer track" from the "dance floor stylists", adding, "Hard beats and Caron Wheeler's silky vocals will ensure heavy chart action once more." Pat Sharp for Smash Hits named it Single of the Fortnight, writing, "Brilliant. I don't have to listen to this one. I know it really well already. I much prefer it to "Keep On Movin'"." He concluded, "This one is miles better. I've been playing this one for a while. It's really simple and tuneful."

Retrospective response
In an 2019 retrospective review, Justin Chadwick from Albumism wrote in his review of Club Classics Vol. One, "While “Keep on Movin'” lit the fuse for the group’s ascendance across radio and the sales charts, another Wheeler blessed composition kept the flame burning bright. Originally—and in retrospect, somewhat incredulously—included on the album in stripped-down, acapella form, “Back to Life” further illuminated Wheeler’s vocal prowess as she sang about seeking romantic clarity, with the drums borrowed from Graham Central Station's "The Jam" kicking in at the 2:40 mark. In short order following the album’s release, the song was reworked into a more robust midtempo groove, its instant earworm appeal and unforgettable hook (“How ever do you want me, how / How ever do you need me”) all but ensuring its ubiquity throughout the summer of 1989." 

AllMusic editor Alex Henderson declared the song as a "Chic-influenced gem". In an 2009 review, Daryl Easlea for BBC praised its "swooning chorus and churning beat". In 2015, Eric Harvey from Pitchfork wrote, "The mainstream got a taste of house music that was stately and groovy, not dripping with acid, and which sounded fantastic amid clubbish contemporaries like Black Box’s "Ride on Time", Technotronic’s "Pump Up the Jam", Janet Jackson’s "Miss You Much", and Lisa Stansfield’s "All Around the World"."

Music video
The accompanying music video for "Back to Life (However Do You Want Me)" was directed by Monty Whitebloom & Andy Delaney, of Big TV! and was shot in Epping Forest. Wheeler's former-Afrodiziak member and friend Claudia Fontaine sings and dances to the song throughout the video.

The video starts with an opening silhouette of the group dancing in a forest and proceeds with repeated close-up shots of Wheeler singing "Back to life, back to reality". While Wheeler sings the first verse, video shots of the other Soul II Soul members and the band are shown. Another scene is shown on a rooftop during early sunrise as the group parties and dances to the song. Close to the end of the video, the group is shown dancing at night on the same rooftop. Wheeler closes out the song as she sings and dances to the song. The video was later published by Vevo on YouTube in 2009, and by March 2023, it had generated more than 86 million views.

Live performances
Wheeler performed "Back to Life (However Do You Want Me)" on various televised appearances, including the Arsenio Hall Show, Rockopop, and Later... with Jools Holland. At the end of 1989, Wheeler later departed from the group. When Soul II Soul performed the song at 1990 Soul Train Music Awards, Marcia Lewis; a new addition to the group, performed the lead vocals.

The song was included in the group's set list for their A New Decade Tour in 1990 and was performed late in the set on tour dates. Lamya, a later addition to group, performed the lead vocals to the song during the tour. Wheeler also included the song during her solo tours. A live recording of the song was released on Wheeler's live CD/DVD Live at Duo Music Exchange, which featured her performing live in Tokyo, Japan. In 2007, Wheeler reunited with the group and performed the song at the Lovebox Festival. In August 2012, Soul II Soul performed the song at the Rewind Festival in Remenham, Berkshire, with Charlotte Kelly singing lead vocals.

In December 2016, Soul II Soul released their live album Origins: The Roots of Soul II Soul which included a live recorded version on the song, sung by Wheeler.

Impact and legacy
An a cappella version was memorably featured in the opening scene of the 1998 film Belly.

VH1 listed "Back to Life (However Do You Want Me)" at number 50 in its list of the "100 Greatest Dance Songs" in 2000. 

Q Magazine ranked it at number 534 in their list of the "1001 Best Songs Ever" in 2003.

Slant Magazine ranked the song at number 57 in its list of the "100 Greatest Dance Songs" in 2006.

The Guardian featured "Back to Life (However Do You Want Me)" on its "A history of modern music: Dance" in 2011.

In 2015 the song was voted by the British public as the nation's 18th favourite 1980s number one in a poll for ITV.

The song was featured in the Opening Ceremony of the 2012 London Olympics, as part of an extended dance sequence involving popular British songs from the 1960s through the 2010s.

Accolades

(*) indicates the list is unordered.

Track listings and formats

 UK Basic single
 "Back to Life (However Do You Want Me)" (Album Version) – 3:48
 "Back to Life (However Do You Want Me)" (Instrumental) – 4:23
 UK 12-inch single
 "Back to Life (However Do You Want Me)" (Club Mix) – 7:37
 "Back to Life (However Do You Want Me)" (Jam On The Groove) – 5:08
 "Back to the Beats" – 4:38

 US Maxi-single
 "Back to Life" (12" Mix) – 7:37
 "Back to Life" (A Capella Intro Version) – 3:29
 "Back to Life" (LP Version) – 3:50
 "Back to Life" (Jam & The Groove) – 5:08
 "Back to Life" (Bonus Beats) – 4:38

Charts

Weekly charts

Year-end charts

Decade-end charts

Certifications

Cover versions
 In 2019, Hilary Roberts covered the song which went to number one on the US Dance Club Songs chart.

Samples
The song samples:

Graham Central Station - The Jam: drum track

Songs that have sampled this song include:
 Maxi Priest - "Close to You"
 Big Boi – "Shutterbugg"
 The Game – "However Do You Want It"
 Estelle - "Freak"
 The Black Eyed Peas feat. Nas - "Back 2 Hip Hop"
 Little Mix - "Bounce Back"

The song writers are credited on a track by Nuttin' Nyce with the refrain from this song used in the chorus of Down 4 Whateva.

References

External links
 

1989 singles
Soul II Soul songs
UK Singles Chart number-one singles
European Hot 100 Singles number-one singles
Dutch Top 40 number-one singles
Music videos directed by Big T.V.
Songs written by Nellee Hooper
Song recordings produced by Nellee Hooper
Songs written by Jazzie B
Virgin Records singles
1989 songs
Songs written by Simon Law